Listed below are the UCI Women's Teams that compete in 2016 women's road cycling events organized by the International Cycling Union (UCI), including the 2016 UCI Women's World Tour.

Teams overview

The country designation of each team is determined by the country of registration of the largest number of its riders, and is not necessarily the country where the team is registered or based.

Riders

















































































References

2016